Myoung Bok-Hee (born January 29, 1979), also spelled as Myeong Bok-hui, is a South Korean handball player who competed in the 2004 Summer Olympics.

In 2004, she won the silver medal with the South Korean national team. She played three matches including the final and scored three goals.

External links
Profile

1979 births
Living people
South Korean female handball players
Olympic handball players of South Korea
Handball players at the 2004 Summer Olympics
Olympic silver medalists for South Korea
Olympic medalists in handball
Medalists at the 2004 Summer Olympics
Asian Games medalists in handball
Handball players at the 2002 Asian Games
Handball players at the 2006 Asian Games
Handball players at the 2010 Asian Games
Asian Games gold medalists for South Korea
Asian Games bronze medalists for South Korea
Medalists at the 2002 Asian Games
Medalists at the 2006 Asian Games
Medalists at the 2010 Asian Games
21st-century South Korean women